Jacob Aaron Estes (born September 6, 1972) is an American screenwriter and film director known for the award winning film Mean Creek, The Details and Don't Let Go.

Career
Estes was a theatre major at the University of California, Santa Cruz. After that, he went to film school at AFI. Estes also attended the National Playwrights Conference at the Eugene O'Neill Theater Center, which produced two of his plays, Free Lessons and Mean Creek. Estes turned Mean Creek into a screenplay, which became his feature film debut as writer and director in 2004. In his first offering as writer-director, he gained critical acclaim, receiving nominations at various film festivals and winning the Independent Spirit John Cassavetes Award. His second film as writer/director came with the 2011 film The Details, starring Tobey Maguire, Laura Linney, Ray Liotta, Dennis Haysbert, Kerry Washington, and Elizabeth Banks. In 2019, Estes co-wrote and directed the Blumhouse thriller Don't Let Go starring David Oyelowo and Storm Reid.

Personal life
Estes is married to the musician Gretchen Lieberum.

Filmography

References

External links 

AFI Movie Club interview
AllMovie

American film directors
Independent Spirit Award winners
1972 births
Living people